The Geneva Institute for Democracy and Development (GIDD) is an independent international institute dedicated to research into peace, democracy, human rights and socio-economic problems. Established in 2004 in Geneva, GIDD provides data, analysis and recommendations, based on open sources, to policymakers, researchers, media and the interested public.

History and funding
Founded in 2004, this think tank serves to further public education through the production and dissemination of accessible commentary and scholarship. The GIDD aims to provide a balanced and thoughtful perspective on topical issues, promoting open and rational debate based on evidence rather than ideology. The Institute also seeks financial support from other organizations in order to carry out its broad research programme, and in pursuit of its vision and mission.

Structure
GIDD's organizational structure comprises the Research staff, the Organizing Committee and the President, together numbering around 15 people.

International reach
Located in Geneva, Switzerland, GIDD offers a unique platform for researchers from different countries to work in close cooperation. The Institute also hosts guest researchers and interns who work on issues related to the GIDD research programmes. GIDD maintains contacts with other research centres and individual researchers throughout the world.

Research and communications
GIDD’s research agenda is constantly evolving, consistently remaining timely and in high demand. GIDD’s research has a high impact, informing the understandings and choices of policymakers, parliamentarians, diplomats, journalists, and experts. Dissemination channels include an active media and communications programme; seminars and conferences; a website; a monthly newsletter; and a renowned publications programme.

Notes and references

See also 
 Geneva International Peace Research Institute
 Maison de la paix

External links 
 
 GIDD page on ECOSOC NGO Portal

Think tanks based in Switzerland
Human rights organisations based in Switzerland
Organisations based in Switzerland